Daegu University of Foreign Studies was a university of Foreign Studies in Gyeongsan, North Gyeongsang Province, South Korea. It was founded in 1997. In 2018 Ministry of Education ordered closure of the university due to its significant finance troubles and corruption of the founders and leadership after the special audit conducted following the lowest evaluation the university received in 2015.

History
In 2015, an evaluation by the Ministry of Education rated the university in the lowest E group, resulting in the Ministry halting its monetary support and barring the University from all state-funded programs.

See also
List of colleges and universities in South Korea
Education in South Korea

References

External links
 Official school website, in Korean
 Official school website, in English

Universities and colleges in North Gyeongsang Province
Private universities and colleges in South Korea
Educational institutions established in 1997
1997 establishments in South Korea
Defunct universities and colleges in South Korea